El Palmar is a village located in the Pobles del Sud district of the municipality of Valencia. It had a population of 755 in 2017.

Sources 

Geography of Valencia
Populated places in the Province of Valencia